Hemidactylus lamaensis is a species of gecko. It is endemic to Benin.

References

Hemidactylus
Reptiles described in 2010
Reptiles of West Africa
Endemic fauna of Benin